Diamond Candy is the tenth studio album by Taiwanese singer Elva Hsiao, released on 9 October 2009 by Gold Typhoon. The album became the seventh best-selling album of the year in Taiwan.

Track listing
 "Beautiful Encounter 豔遇" (Yan Yu)
 "Shining Love 閃閃惹人愛" (Shan Shan Re Ren Ai)
 "Count Down 倒數" (Dao Shu)
 "Cry with You 我陪你哭" (Wo Pei Ni Ku)
 "Sync Breathing 同步呼吸" (Tong Bu Hu Xi)
 "Goodbye Bye Bye 不愛·請閃開" (Bu Ai Qing Shan Kai)
 "Diamond Candy 鑽石糖" (Zhuan Shi Tang)
 "Confession 坦白" (Tan Bai)
 "No Hand in Hand 我們多久沒牽手" (Wo Men Hen Jiu Mei Qian Shou)
 "Thriller Legend 顫慄傳奇" (Zhan Li Chuan Qi)

References

External Links
Diamond Candy - Elva Hsiao - KKBOX

2009 albums
Elva Hsiao albums
Gold Typhoon Taiwan albums